The Merinizzata Italiana is a breed of domestic sheep from southern Italy. It is a modern breed, created in the first half of the twentieth century or in recent decades by cross-breeding of indigenous Gentile di Puglia and Sopravissana stock with imported Merino breeds such as the French Berrichon du Cher and Île-de-France, and the German Merinolandschaf. The aim was to produce a good meat breed without sacrificing wool quality. The Merinizzata Italiana is raised mostly in Abruzzo, mainly in the provinces of L'Aquila and Teramo, with small numbers in neighbouring regions.

The Merinizzata Italiana is one of the seventeen autochthonous Italian sheep breeds for which a genealogical herdbook is kept by the Associazione Nazionale della Pastorizia, the Italian national association of sheep-breeders. In 2000 total numbers for the breed were estimated at 600,000, of which 19,000 were registered in the herdbook; in 2013 the number recorded in the herdbook was 27,260. 

Lambs are usually weaned at 6–7 weeks, and slaughtered soon after, at a weight of 10–15 kg. Rams yield about 4.5 kg of wool, ewes about 2.5 kg; the wool is of good quality, with a fibre diameter of 18–26 microns.

References

Sheep breeds originating in Italy